Valle Hermoso is a census-designated place (CDP) in Starr County, Texas, United States. Although a new CDP for the 2010 census the population was listed as zero.

Geography
Valle Hermoso is located at  (26.382268, -98.787117).

Education
It is in the Rio Grande City Grulla Independent School District (formerly Rio Grande City Consolidated Independent School District)

References

Census-designated places in Starr County, Texas
Census-designated places in Texas